The Slovene lands or Slovenian lands ( or in short ) is the historical denomination for the territories in Central and Southern Europe where people primarily spoke Slovene. The Slovene lands were part of the Illyrian provinces, the Austrian Empire and Austria-Hungary (in Cisleithania). They encompassed Carniola, southern part of Carinthia, southern part of Styria, Istria, Gorizia and Gradisca, Trieste, and Prekmurje. Their territory more or less corresponds to modern Slovenia and the adjacent territories in Italy, Austria, Hungary, and Croatia, where autochthonous Slovene minorities live. In the areas where present-day Slovenia borders to neighboring countries, they were never homogeneously ethnically Slovene.

Terminology 
Like the Slovaks, the Slovenes preserve the self-designation of the early Slavs as their ethnonym. The term  Slovenia ("Slovenija") was not in use prior to the early 19th century, when it was coined for political purposes by the Slovene romantic nationalists, most probably by some pupils of the linguist Jernej Kopitar. It started to be used only from the 1840s on, when the quest for a politically autonomous United Slovenia within the Austrian Empire was first advanced during the Spring of Nations. "Slovenia" became a  de facto     distinctive administrative and political entity for the first time in 1918, with the unilateral declaration of the  State of Slovenes, Croats and Serbs, that Slovenia.

Although Slovenia did not exist as an autonomous administrative unit between 1921 and 1941, the Drava Banovina of the Kingdom of Yugoslavia was frequently called simply "Slovenia", even in some official documents.

Consequently, most Slovene scholars prefer to refer to the "Slovene lands" in English rather than "Slovenia" to describe the territory of modern Slovenia and neighbouring areas in earlier times. The use of the English term "Slovenia" is generally considered by Slovene scholars to be anachronistic due to its modern origin.

Geographical extension 

In the 19th century, the territories regarded as part of the Slovene lands were:

Carniola
southern Carinthia
Lower Styria
Slovene March in the Vas county of the Kingdom of Hungary, and the adjacent zones of the Zala county (Beltinci, Turnišče, Velika Polana, Kobilje)
 Jennersdorf in the Kingdom of Hungary (now in Burgenland, Austria);
 most of the County of Gorizia and Gradisca, except for the lowlands south-west of Gradisca and Cormons, which were already part of historical Friuli
 the Imperial Free City of Trieste, a city in modern Italy
 northern Istria, in the modern municipalities of Koper, Izola, Piran, Hrpelje-Kozina, Muggia and Dolina
 Venetian Slovenia (Italian: Slavia Vèneta), until 1797 part of the Republic of Venice, later Kingdom of Lombardy–Venetia

The Žumberak and the area around Čabar, which today belong to Croatia, were long part of the Duchy of Carniola, and thus generally regarded as part of the Slovene lands, especially prior to the emergence of Romantic nationalism in the 19th century, when the exact ethnic border between Slovenes and Croats had not yet been specified.

Not all of the territories referred to as the "Slovene lands" have always had a Slovene-speaking majority. Several towns, especially in Lower Styria, maintained a German-speaking majority until the late 1910s, most notably Maribor, Celje and Ptuj. The area around Kočevje in Lower Carniola, known as the Gottschee County, had a predominantly German-speaking population between the 14th century and 1941 when they were resettled in an agreement between Nazi German and Fascist Italian occupation forces. A similar German "linguistic island" within an ethnically Slovene territory existed in what is now the Italian comune of Tarvisio, but used to belong to the Duchy of Carinthia until 1919. The city of Trieste, whose municipal territory has been regarded by Slovenes to be an integral part of the Slovene lands, has always had a Romance-speaking majority (first Friulian, then Venetian and Italian). A similar case is that of the town of Gorizia, which served as a major religious center of the Slovene lands for centuries, but was inhabited by a mixed Italian-Slovene-Friulian-German population. The towns of Koper, Izola and Piran, surrounded by an ethnically Slovene population, were inhabited almost exclusively by Venetian-speaking Italians until the Istrian–Dalmatian exodus in the late 1940s and 1950s, as were large areas of the comune of Muggia. In southern Carinthia, a process of Germanization started by the end of the 1840s, creating several German-speaking areas within what had previously been a compact Slovene territory. Since the late 1950s, most of southern Carinthia has had a German-speaking majority, with the local Slovene minority living in a scattered pattern throughout the area.

On the other hand, other areas with historically important Slovene communities, such as the Croatian cities of Rijeka and Zagreb, as well as the Slovene villages in the Somogy county of Hungary (the Somogy Slovenes), were never regarded to be part of the Slovene lands. The same goes for the Slovene communities in south-west Friuli (in the villages of Gradisca, Gradiscutta, Gorizzo, Goricizza, Lestizza, and Belgrado in the lower Tagliamento area) which extinguished themselves by the end of the 16th century.

See also 

History of Slovenia
Carinthian Slovenes
Hungarian Slovenes
Slavia Friulana (Beneška Slovenija)
Slovene minority in Italy (1920–1947)

References

Further reading 
Bogo Grafenauer, Slovensko narodno vprašanje in slovenski zgodovinski položaj (Ljubljana: Slovenska matica, 1987)
Josip Gruden & Josip Mal, Zgodovina slovenskega naroda I.-II. (Celje: Mohorjeva družba, 1992-1993)
Janko Prunk, A brief history of Slovenia: Historical background of the Republic of Slovenia (Ljubljana: Mihelač, 1994)

External links
 Peter Kozler's 1853 map of the Slovene lands on Geopedia

 
Former states and territories in Slovenia
Geography of Central Europe
Geography of Southeastern Europe
Divided regions
Cultural history of Slovenia
Political history of Slovenia